This is a list of National Basketball Association players whose last names begin with B.

The list also includes players from the American National Basketball League (NBL), the Basketball Association of America (BAA), and the original American Basketball Association (ABA). All of these leagues contributed to the formation of the present-day NBA.

Individuals who played in the NBL prior to its 1949 merger with the BAA are listed in italics, as they are not traditionally listed in the NBA's official player registers.

B

Chris Babb
Luke Babbitt
Milos Babic
Johnny Bach
Dwayne Bacon
Henry Bacon
Jim Baechtold
Carl Baer
Dalibor Bagarić
John Bagley
Marvin Bagley III
Carl Bailey
Gus Bailey
James Bailey
Thurl Bailey
Toby Bailey
Frank Baird
Cameron Bairstow
Bob Baker
Jimmie Baker
Mark Baker
Maurice Baker
Norm Baker
Ron Baker
Vin Baker
Art Bakeraitis
Patrick Baldwin Jr.
Wade Baldwin IV
Renaldo Balkman
Cedric Ball
Herb Ball
LaMelo Ball
Lonzo Ball
Greg Ballard
Herschel Baltimore
Mohamed Bamba
Paolo Banchero
Desmond Bane
Gene Banks
Marcus Banks
Walker Banks
Ken Bannister
Mike Bantom
Dalano Banton
Anthony Barber
John Barber
Leandro Barbosa
Steve Bardo
J. J. Barea
Andrea Bargnani
Cliff Barker
Tom Barker
Charles Barkley
Erick Barkley
Don Barksdale
Lou Barle
Dominick Barlow
Harrison Barnes
Harry Barnes
Jim Barnes
Marvin Barnes
Matt Barnes
Scottie Barnes
Dick Barnett
Jim Barnett
Nate Barnett
Shannie Barnett
John Barnhill
Norton Barnhill
Leo Barnhorst
John Barr
Mike Barr
Moe Barr
Andre Barrett
Ernie Barrett
Mike Barrett
RJ Barrett
Earl Barron
Dana Barros
Brent Barry
Drew Barry
Jon Barry
Rick Barry
Edward Bartels
Vic Bartolome
Will Barton
Eddie Basden
Jerry Baskerville
Brandon Bass
Paris Bass
Tim Bassett
Charles Bassey
Maceo Baston
Billy Ray Bates
Keita Bates-Diop
Esteban Batista
Michael Batiste
Buck Batterman
Tony Battie
Shane Battier
John Battle
Kenny Battle
Dave Batton
Lloyd Batts
Nicolas Batum
Johnny Baum
Frank Baumholtz
Lonny Baxter
Jerryd Bayless
Elgin Baylor
Howard Bayne
Aron Baynes
Sergei Bazarevich
Kent Bazemore
Darius Bazley
Ed Beach
Bradley Beal
Al Beard
Butch Beard
Ralph Beard
Charlie Beasley
Jerome Beasley
John Beasley
Malik Beasley
Michael Beasley
Frank Beaty
Zelmo Beaty
Rodrigue Beaubois
MarJon Beauchamp
Byron Beck
Corey Beck
Ernie Beck
Art Becker
Moe Becker
Tom Becker
Bob Bedell
William Bedford
Hank Beenders
Don Beery
Ron Behagen
Elmer Behnke
Bill Behr
Marco Belinelli
Byron Bell
Charlie Bell
Dennis Bell
Jordan Bell
Raja Bell
Troy Bell
Whitey Bell
Walt Bellamy
Ray Bellingham
DeAndre' Bembry
Irv Bemoras
Leon Benbow
Dragan Bender
Jonathan Bender
Jerrelle Benimon
Benoit Benjamin
Corey Benjamin
Emil Benko
Anthony Bennett
Elmer Bennett
Mario Bennett
Mel Bennett
Spider Bennett
Tony Bennett
Wesley Bennett
Winston Bennett
David Benoit
Al Benson
Keith Benson
Kent Benson
Ben Bentil
Gene Berce
Beanie Berens
Fred Beretta
Gary Bergen
Larry Bergh
Connie Mack Berry
Ricky Berry
Walter Berry
Dairis Bertāns
Dāvis Bertāns
Del Beshore
Travis Best
Don Betourne
Patrick Beverley
Saddiq Bey
Tyler Bey
Sim Bhullar
Wes Bialosuknia
Al Bianchi
Johnny Bianco
Hank Biasatti
Henry Bibby
Mike Bibby
Eddie Biedenbach
Andris Biedriņš
Don Bielke
Bob Bigelow
Max Biggs
Lionel Billingy
Chauncey Billups
Dave Bing
Joe Binion
Khem Birch
Paul Birch
Jabari Bird
Jerry Bird
Larry Bird
Otis Birdsong
Emmet Birk
Jim Birr
Gale Bishop
Ralph Bishop
Goga Bitadze
Bismack Biyombo
Nemanja Bjelica
Uwe Blab
Charles Black
Norman Black
Tarik Black
Tom Black
Thermon Blacklidge
Rolando Blackman
Alex Blackwell
Cory Blackwell
James Blackwell
Nate Blackwell
DeJuan Blair
Steve Blake
Antonio Blakeney
Will Blalock
George Blaney
Lance Blanks
Ricky Blanton
Andray Blatche
Mookie Blaylock
Eric Bledsoe
Keljin Blevins
Leon Blevins
John Block
Chuck Bloedorn
Mike Bloom
Jaron Blossomgame
Corie Blount
Mark Blount
Vander Blue
Ray Blume
Nelson Bobb
Tony Bobbitt
Bucky Bockhorn
Buddy Boeheim
Bruce Boehler
Tom Boerwinkle
Keith Bogans
Bogdan Bogdanović
Bojan Bogdanović
Ed Bogdanski
Muggsy Bogues
Andrew Bogut
Etdrick Bohannon
Bol Bol
Manute Bol
Jonah Bolden
Marques Bolden
Bill Bolger
Leandro Bolmaro
Joel Bolomboy
Doug Bolstorff
Bob Bolyard
George Bon Salle
Phil Bond
Walter Bond
Jordan Bone
Dexter Boney
Isaac Bonga
Ron Bonham
Herb Bonn
Anthony Bonner
Matt Bonner
Al Bonniwell
Butch Booker
Devin Booker
Melvin Booker
Trevor Booker
Josh Boone
Ron Boone
Calvin Booth
Keith Booth
Bob Boozer
Carlos Boozer
Curtis Borchardt
Jake Bornheimer
Lazaro Borrell
Wally Borrevik
Ike Borsavage
Vince Boryla
John Bosak
Chris Bosh
Jim Bostic
Brandon Boston Jr.
Lawrence Boston
Sonny Boswell
Tom Boswell
Chris Boucher
Lou Boudreau
James Bouknight
Ruben Boumtje-Boumtje
Jamaree Bouyea
Don Boven
Cal Bowdler
Brian Bowen
Bruce Bowen
Ryan Bowen
Tom Bowens
Harold Bower
Anthony Bowie
Sam Bowie
Orbie Bowling
Ira Bowman
Ky Bowman
Nate Bowman
Wink Bowman
Donnie Boyce
Dennis Boyd
Fred Boyd
Ken Boyd
Earl Boykins
Harry Boykoff
Winford Boynes
Cedric Bozeman
Steve Bracey
Craig Brackins
Gary Bradds
Alex Bradley
Alonzo Bradley
Avery Bradley
Bill Bradley (b. 1941)
Bill Bradley (b. 1943)
Charles Bradley
Dudley Bradley
Jim Bradley
Joe Bradley
Michael Bradley
Shawn Bradley
Tony Bradley
Mark Bradtke
Marques Bragg
Torraye Braggs
A. J. Bramlett
Adrian Branch
Elton Brand
Terrell Brandon
Malaki Branham
Bob Brannum
Brad Branson
Jesse Branson
Jarrell Brantley
Jim Brasco
Mike Bratz
Carl Braun
Christian Braun
Ignas Brazdeikis
Tim Breaux
J. R. Bremer
Pete Brennan
Tom Brennan
Irv Brenner
Randy Breuer
Corey Brewer
Jamison Brewer
Jim Brewer
Ron Brewer
Ronnie Brewer
Primož Brezec
Frank Brian
Frank Brickowski
Junior Bridgeman
Bill Bridges
Mikal Bridges
Miles Bridges
Al Brightman
Amida Brimah
Aud Brindley
Isaiah Briscoe
John Brisker
Oshae Brissett
Allan Bristow
Tyrone Britt
Wayman Britt
Mike Brittain
David Britton
Jon Brockman
Ryan Broekhoff
Jim Brogan
Malcolm Brogdon
Gary Brokaw
Price Brookfield
Clarence Brookins
Aaron Brooks
Armoni Brooks
Dillon Brooks
Kevin Brooks
MarShon Brooks
Michael Brooks
Scott Brooks
Andre Brown
Anthony Brown
Bill Brown
Bob Brown (b. 1921)
Bob Brown (b. 1923)
Bobby Brown
Bruce Brown Jr.
Charlie Brown Jr.
Chaundee Brown
Chucky Brown
Damone Brown
Darrel Brown
Dee Brown (b. 1968)
Dee Brown (b. 1984)
Derrick Brown
Devin Brown
Ernest Brown
Fred Brown
George Brown
Gerald Brown
Greg Brown
Harold Brown
Hillery Brown
Jabari Brown
Jaylen Brown
Jim Brown
John Brown
Kedrick Brown
Kendall Brown
Kwame Brown
Larry Brown
Leon Brown
Lewis Brown
Lorenzo Brown
Marcus Brown
Markel Brown
Marshall Brown
Mike Brown
Moses Brown
Myron Brown
P. J. Brown
Randy Brown
Raymond Brown
Rickey Brown
Roger Brown (b. 1942)
Roger Brown (b. 1950)
Rookie Brown
Shannon Brown
Stan Brown
Sterling Brown
Tierre Brown
Tony Brown
Troy Brown Jr.
Jim Browne
Bill Brownell
Stanley Brundy
Brian Brunkhorst
George Bruns
Jalen Brunson
Rick Brunson
Nicolás Brussino
Elijah Bryant
Em Bryant
Joe Bryant
Kobe Bryant
Mark Bryant
Thomas Bryant
Wallace Bryant
Torgeir Bryn
George Bucci
Shaq Buchanan
Joe Buckhalter
Steve Bucknall
Cleveland Buckner
Greg Buckner
Quinn Buckner
Dave Budd
Chase Budinger
Walt Budko
Jud Buechler
Ken Buehler
Rodney Buford
Matt Bullard
Reggie Bullock
Larry Bunce
Greg Bunch
Dick Bunt
Bill Buntin
Bill Bunting
Luther Burden
Pat Burke
Trey Burke
Roger Burkman
Alec Burks
Antonio Burks
Kevin Burleson
Tommy Burleson
Jack Burmaster
David Burns
Evers Burns
Jim Burns
Scott Burrell
Art Burris
Junior Burrough
Bob Burrow
Deonte Burton
Ed Burton
Willie Burton
Steve Burtt
Don Buse
Jerry Bush
Sam Busich
Dave Bustion
Donnie Butcher
Al Butler
Caron Butler
Charlie Butler
Greg Butler
Jackie Butler
Jared Butler
Jimmy Butler
John Butler
Mike Butler
Mitchell Butler
Rasual Butler
Dwight Buycks
Derrick Byars
Andrew Bynum
Will Bynum
Walt Byrd
Marty Byrnes
Tommy Byrnes
Mike Bytzura

References
  NBA & ABA Players with Last Names Starting with B @ basketball-reference.com
 NBL Players with Last Names Starting with B @ basketball-reference.com

B